Brandon Stone (born 20 April 1993) is a South African professional golfer who plays on the Challenge Tour and Sunshine Tour. He represented South Africa at the 2016 Summer Olympics.

Amateur career
Stone won several amateur tournaments in South Africa and played on the 2012 South Africa Eisenhower Trophy team. He played one year of college golf at the University of Texas, winning three events, before turning professional in 2013.

Professional career
In 2015, Stone played on the Sunshine Tour and Challenge Tour. He finished 14th on the Challenge Tour rankings, aided by second-place finishes at the Barclays Kenya Open and GANT Open and graduated to the European Tour. In November 2015, he earned his first professional win at the Sunshine Tour's Lion of Africa Cape Town Open.

In January 2016, making his second European Tour start as a full member, Stone won the South African Open by two strokes. The event was co-sanctioned with the Sunshine Tour.

In July 2017, Stone employed Alan Burns as his full time caddie commencing with The Open Championship. He had previously worked with Burns at the Alfred Dunhill Championship in December 2015.

He won the 2018 Aberdeen Standard Investments Scottish Open at Gullane with a final-round 60, tying the European Tour record, after narrowly missing a birdie putt on the final hole that would have given him a 59.

In April 2021, Stone won the Limpopo Championship after a four-man playoff, making a birdie at the first extra hole.

Amateur wins
2010 Boland Open, Southern Cape Amateur
2011 Prince's Grant Invitational, North West Open, Limpopo Open, Ekurhuleni Open
2012 KwaZulu Natal Open, Prince's Grant Invitational, Sanlam Cape Province Open, Carpet Capital Collegiate
2013 Bayou City Collegiate, Big 12 Championship

Source:

Professional wins (5)

European Tour wins (3)

1Co-sanctioned by the Sunshine Tour

European Tour playoff record (0–1)

Sunshine Tour wins (4)

1Co-sanctioned by the European Tour
2Co-sanctioned by the Challenge Tour

Sunshine Tour playoff record (1–0)

Challenge Tour wins (1)

1Co-sanctioned by the Sunshine Tour

Challenge Tour playoff record (1–1)

Results in major championships
Results not in chronological order in 2020.

CUT = missed the half-way cut
"T" = tied
NT = No tournament due to COVID-19 pandemic

Results in World Golf Championships

1Cancelled due to COVID-19 pandemic

NT = No tournament
"T" = tied

Team appearances
Amateur
Eisenhower Trophy (representing South Africa): 2012

See also
2015 Challenge Tour graduates

References

External links

South African male golfers
Texas Longhorns men's golfers
Sunshine Tour golfers
European Tour golfers
Olympic golfers of South Africa
Golfers at the 2016 Summer Olympics
People from Rustenburg
Sportspeople from Pretoria
1993 births
Living people
White South African people